Walter J. Little (September 13, 1894 - October 11, 1960) was a Republican politician who served in the California State Assembly for the 56th, 60th and 62nd districts from 1925 to 1934, and served as its Speaker in 1933. He served in the United States Army during World War I.

References

United States Army personnel of World War I
1894 births
1960 deaths
20th-century American politicians
Republican Party members of the California State Assembly
People from Hammond, Indiana